The Kia GT Concept is a concept car manufactured by Kia Motors. The car was revealed in 2011.

Description 

Unveiled at the 2011 Frankfurt Motor Show, the GT Concept is a 4-door, rear-wheel-drive sedan featuring suicide doors and a  3.3-litre turbocharged V6 with a 6-speed automatic transmission.

Production 
The car became the design basis for the Kia K9 and the Kia Stinger.

References

GT